Delphastus is a genus of lady beetles in the family Coccinellidae. There are more than 20 described species in Delphastus.

Species
These 23 species belong to the genus Delphastus:

 Delphastus abditus Gordon
 Delphastus amazonensis Gordon
 Delphastus anthracinus Gordon
 Delphastus barti Duverger, 1986
 Delphastus berryi Gordon
 Delphastus catalinae (Horn, 1895)
 Delphastus celatus Gordon
 Delphastus chapini Gordon
 Delphastus collaris Chapin
 Delphastus dejavu Gordon
 Delphastus diversipes (Champion, 1913)
 Delphastus ecuadorensis Gordon
 Delphastus flavicollis Gordon
 Delphastus hirtulus Kirsch
 Delphastus huahuai Gordon
 Delphastus minutus Gordon
 Delphastus nebulosus Chapin, 1940
 Delphastus pallidus (LeConte, 1878)
 Delphastus pusillus (Leconte, 1852) (whitefly predator)
 Delphastus quinculus Gordon
 Delphastus sonoricus Casey
 Delphastus subtropicus Casey
 Delphastus violaceus Casey

References

Further reading

 
 

Coccinellidae
Coccinellidae genera
Articles created by Qbugbot